The 2012 NCAA Division III women's basketball tournament was the 31st annual tournament hosted by the NCAA to determine the national champion of Division III women's collegiate basketball in the United States.

Illinois Wesleyan defeated George Fox in the championship game, 57–48, to claim the Titans' first Division III national title.

The championship rounds were hosted by Hope College at the DeVos Fieldhouse in Holland, Michigan.

Bracket

Final Four

All-tournament team
 Olivia Lett, Illinois Wesleyan
 Hannah Munger, George Fox
 Keisha Gordon, George Fox
 Caroline Stedman, Amherst
 Maggie Weiers, St. Thomas (MN)

See also
 2012 NCAA Division I women's basketball tournament
 2012 NCAA Division II women's basketball tournament
 2012 NAIA Division I women's basketball tournament
 2012 NAIA Division II women's basketball tournament
 2012 NCAA Division III men's basketball tournament

References

 
NCAA Division III women's basketball tournament
2012 in sports in Michigan
Illinois Wesleyan Titans
George Fox Bruins